Kleśa (also klesha) is a term from Indian philosophy and yoga, meaning a "poison". The third  of the second chapter of Patañjali's Yoga sūtras explicitly identifies Five Poisons:

Translated into English, these five s or afflictions are:
 Ignorance (in the form of a misapprehension about reality),
 egoism (in the form of an erroneous identification of the Self with the intellect),
 attachment,
 aversion, and
 fear of death (which is derived from clinging ignorantly to life).

The 24th sutra of the first chapter, Samadhi Pada, Patanjali describes a purusha free of kleshas:

See also
 Kleshas (Buddhism)
 Maya (illusion)

References

Further reading

Hindu philosophical concepts
Sanskrit words and phrases